The Politics of Cruelty: An Essay on the Literature of Political Imprisonment is the eighth book by American feminist writer and activist Kate Millett. It was published in 1994 by W. W. Norton & Company. Advertised as Millett's "most important work since Sexual Politics" (1970), American writer E. J. Levy described it as "an examination of twentieth-century torture, as it is revealed through the literature of its witnesses" and noted that, although not explicitly mentioned, Millett's imprisonment in Northern Ireland in 1980 informs the work.

Reception

Kirkus Reviews stated that "the almost total absence of research or firsthand interviews, and the heavy-handed use of 'patriarchy' as a generic explanation for the world's ills are disappointing" and that Millett's final analysis "doesn't rise far over the level of op-ed exhortation". In a rather negative review from Socialist Review, Austin Challen found the book "a reminder of the barbarity of the capitalist state... but offers no suggestions on how to organise in opposition." As appears on the back cover, feminist scholar Catharine Stimpson said it is "perhaps her strongest book since Sexual Politics", and Stan Persky of Toronto Globe and Mail described it as an "eloquent, important book."

References

Further reading
 
 

1994 non-fiction books
American non-fiction books
Books about literature
Books about terrorism
Books about violence
Books by Kate Millett
English-language books
Feminist books
W. W. Norton & Company books